Dmitri Mikhailovich Sukharev (born 14 January 2001) is a Russian football player.

Club career
He made his debut in the Russian Football National League for FC Metallurg Lipetsk on 31 July 2021 in a game against FC Neftekhimik Nizhnekamsk.

References

External links
 
 
 Profile by Russian Football National League

2001 births
Sportspeople from Lipetsk
Living people
Russian footballers
Russia youth international footballers
Association football defenders
FC Lokomotiv Moscow players
FC Metallurg Lipetsk players
Russian Second League players
Russian First League players